Deh-e Jamal (also Romanized as Deh-e Jamāl) is a village in Asfyj Rural District, Asfyj District, Behabad County, Yazd Province, Iran. At the 2006 census, its population was 240, in 66 families.

References 

Populated places in Behabad County